Ovanir Buosi is a Brazilian clarinetist. He plays with the Sao Paulo State Symphony Orchestra.

Early life and education 
Buosi was born in Sao Paulo, Brazil. He studied with Sergio Burgani at the Sao Paulo State University, graduating in 1997. He joined the Sao Paulo State Symphony Orchestra shortly after graduation. He studied with Michael Collins at the Royal College of Music in 2002.

Career 
He performed with London Winds at the Cheltenham Festival, in recordings for BBC Radio 3, and the 2004 BBC Proms. He was a member of the Southbank Sinfonia in 2004. He recorded with the Curitiba Wind Quintet.

Buosi plays on a Peter Eaton International model clarinet.

Discography
Villa-Lobos: Choros Vol 3, with Sao Paulo State Symphony Orchestra and Chorus. Bis, 2008.
Villa-Lobos: Complete Choros & Bachianas Brasileiras, with various artists. Bis, 2009.

Awards and recognitions 
Buosi has won the Brazil Young Soloists Competition, the Weril Wind Prize, the Eldorado Music Prize and the RadioMEC Young Soloists National Competition.

References

Year of birth missing (living people)
Living people
Brazilian clarinetists
21st-century clarinetists
São Paulo State University alumni